Évrard d'Espinques was a French manuscript illuminator active between 1440 and 1494.

References

15th-century French people
Manuscript illuminators